Jayalalita is an Indian character actor, who acted in about 650 films in Telugu, Tamil, Kannada,  Malayalam and Hindi.

Early life
Jayalalita was born in Gudivada, a town in Krishna district of the Indian state of Andhra Pradesh. She completed her Bachelor of Arts. She, with her sister, did 1000 stage shows. She was trained in classical dance.

Filmography

Tamil movies

Periya Marudhu (1994) - Sevventhi flower shop goundamani
Aval Varuvala (1998) - Ammukutty

Television
 Goranta Deepam as Durgamma (Zee Telugu)
 Mutyala Muggu as Mukta Devi (Zee Telugu)
 Radha Gopalam as Kondaveeti Jayadevamma (Gemini TV)
 Ammamma.com as Ammamma (MAA TV)
 Gruha pravesham (Zee Telugu)
 Deeparadhana as Malini Devi (Gemini TV)
Alitho Saradaga as herself (ETV)
 Mounaraagam as Temple's chief (cameo) (Star Maa)
  Prema Entha Madhuram as sharadha devi Zee telugu
 Trinayini as Lalitha Devi (cameo) Zee telugu
 Saadhana as Rajya Lakshmi (Gemini TV)

References

External links
 

Telugu actresses
20th-century Indian actresses
Telugu comedians
Indian film actresses
Year of birth missing (living people)
Living people
Actresses in Malayalam cinema
Actresses in Tamil cinema
Actresses in Telugu cinema
Actresses in Hindi cinema
Indian women comedians
Tamil comedians
Malayalam comedians
Actresses from Andhra Pradesh
People from Krishna district
21st-century Indian actresses
Indian television actresses
Actresses in Telugu television